Bottiaea (Greek:  Bottiaia) was a geographical region of ancient Macedonia and an administrative district of the Macedonian Kingdom. It was previously inhabited by the Bottiaeans, a people of uncertain origin, later expelled by the Macedonians into Bottike (Chalcidice). In Roman times it was replaced by Emathia as a geographical term.

Geography
Bottiaea comprised the northeastern part of Imathia and the area between the Loudias and the Axios Rivers (the western area of today's Giannitsa).

Towns
The historic cities of Bottiaea were Aigae (Vergina) first capital of Macedon, Aloros, Pella (second capital of Macedon), Edessa, Mieza, Atalanta, Gortynia, Kyrros, Skydra, Ichnae and Beroea.

References

External links
Ancient coinage of Bottiaea
Current locations of Bottiaea region.

 
Geography of ancient Macedonia